("Font Santa's Well", also known as  or ) is an historic building, housing a rainwater storage well, in the municipality of Campos, Majorca.

It used a double filter system and delivered water to external and internal wash basins, as well as drinking troughs for animals.

Restoration 

The well was restored in 2007–2009. A stone plaque affixed to it states:

References 

Buildings and structures in Mallorca
Water wells in Spain
Buildings and structures completed in 1673
1673 establishments in Spain